The Seri Perdana Bridge is a  bridge which is built across the Putrajaya Lake in Putrajaya, Malaysia's federal administrative centre.

It is based on royal Islamic architectural design. This bridge contains eight unique balconies / rest areas for visitors to enjoy the panoramic sights of the surrounding lake area. 

The bridge is made up of seven central spans of 75m and two end spans of 55m. There are two separate carriageways over two twin cell box girder. In the cross section, the overall width between extreme ends of two box girder is 23m. The footpath is flanked by railings and the road's median is lined by decorative street-lighting.

See also
 Transport in Malaysia

Bridges in Putrajaya
1999 establishments in Malaysia
20th-century architecture in Malaysia